= Opioid agonist treatment =

Opioid agonist treatment may refer to:

- Any treatment involving opioid agonists
- Opioid Agonist Treatment or OAT, an opioid dependence treatment program performed by CSAT-accredited facilities using opioid agonists
